Statistics of Moldovan National Division for the 1992–93 season.

Overview
It was contested by 16 teams and Zimbru Chişinău won the championship.

Teams

League standings

Results

References
Moldova - List of final tables (RSSSF)

Moldovan Super Liga seasons
1992–93 in Moldovan football
Moldova